Tony Keenan (born 6 May 1964) is a former Australian rules footballer who played with Collingwood in the Victorian Football League (VFL). 

Keenan, from Greensborough, captained the 1981 Victorian Teal Cup team, which featured future greats Dermott Brereton, Gary Pert and Paul Salmon. He also played in the 1980 Victorian Teal Cup team.

A ruckman and key position player, Keenan played three VFL games for Collingwood, two in 1982 and one in 1984. He was traded to Melbourne midway through the 1984 season, in return for fellow ruckman Glenn McLean, but suffered a knee injury before joining his new club and didn't play for the rest of the year. The following season he was again on the sidelines after dislocating a shoulder and undergoing reconstructive surgery. He left Melbourne without playing a senior game and then had stints at Preston, Bulleen-Templestowe and Norwood.

References

1964 births
Australian rules footballers from Victoria (Australia)
Collingwood Football Club players
Preston Football Club (VFA) players
Norwood Football Club players
Living people